The Georgetown-Williamson County Veterans Memorial Plaza, or simply Veterans Memorial Plaza, is a memorial situated in Sun City Texas, in Georgetown, Texas, United States. The site hosts Memorial Day and Veterans Day ceremonies, which have been attended by politicians and military personnel such as John Carter (2011), Sean MacFarland (2014), and Charles Schwertner (2014). Completed in the early 2000s, the plaza features more than 4,000 bricks inscribed with the names of veterans, as of 2015.

References

External links
 
 

2000s establishments in Texas
Georgetown, Texas
Monuments and memorials in Texas